Lies Visschedijk (born 14 January 1974) is a Dutch actress. She appeared in more than thirty films since 1997.

Selected filmography

References

External links 

1974 births
Living people
Dutch film actresses
Dutch television actresses
Dutch stage actresses
People from Maasgouw
21st-century Dutch actresses